Peggy Shannon (born Winona Sammon; January 10, 1907
 – May 11, 1941) was an American actress. She appeared on the stage and screen of the 1920s and 1930s.

Shannon began her career as a Ziegfeld girl in 1923 before moving on to Broadway productions. She was signed to Paramount Pictures and groomed to replace Clara Bow as the newest "It girl", whom she replaced in the 1931 film, The Secret Call. Her growing dependency on alcohol eventually derailed her career. She appeared in her final film Triple Justice in 1940. In May 1941, Shannon died at the age of 34 from a heart attack, brought on by alcoholism. Her husband Albert G. Roberts shot himself three weeks after her death.

Career

Shannon was born in Pine Bluff, Arkansas in 1907 (some sources erroneously cite 1909 or 1910) to Edward and Nannie Sammon. She had a younger sister, Carol. She attended Annunciation Academy Catholic School and Pine Bluff High School and then was hired as a chorus girl by Florenz Ziegfeld while visiting her aunt in New York in 1923. The following year, she was cast in the Ziegfeld Follies followed by a role in Earl Carroll's Vanities. While on Broadway in 1927, she was spotted by B.P. Schulberg, production head of Paramount Pictures, and was offered a contract. When she arrived in Hollywood, she was hailed as the next "It girl", replacing Clara Bow. Before the shooting of The Secret Call, Bow had suffered a nervous breakdown, and Shannon was hired to replace her only two days after her arrival in Hollywood.

Shannon sometimes worked 16-hour days (from 10 a.m. to 4 a.m. the next day) while shooting a film, and when shooting wrapped, rushed to begin another film. She occasionally worked on two separate films in one day. Through films and publicity, Shannon became known as a fashion plate, wearing styles three months before they became popular. In 1932, she signed a new contract at Fox and became known as difficult and temperamental on the set and was rumored to have had a drinking problem. In 1934, Shannon returned to New York City to do the Broadway show, Page Miss Glory.

In 1935, she continued on Broadway with The Light Behind the Shadow, but was soon replaced, with a press release claiming a tooth infection, though rumors claimed it was her drinking. In 1936, she returned to Hollywood with Youth on Parole. She found it harder to conceal her drinking. Fewer movie roles were offered, and her drinking worsened. She made her last film appearance in the 1940 film Triple Justice, opposite George O'Brien.

Personal life
In 1926, Shannon married her first husband, actor Alan Davis. The marriage ended in July 1940. She married second husband, cameraman Albert G. Roberts, later that year.

Death
On May 11, 1941, Shannon's husband Albert Roberts and a fellow studio worker returned from a fishing trip to find Shannon dead in their North Hollywood apartment. She was slumped over the kitchen table, a cigarette in her mouth and an empty glass in her hand. She had been dead for approximately 12 hours. An autopsy revealed that she had died of a heart attack brought on by a liver ailment and a run-down condition. She is interred at Hollywood Forever Cemetery. Three weeks after Shannon's death, her husband committed suicide by shooting himself with a .22 rifle in the same chair in which she had died. His suicide note read "I am very much in love with my wife, Peggy Shannon. In this spot she died, so in reverence to her, you will find me in the same spot."

Broadway credits

Filmography

Footnotes

Sources

 Brettell, Andrew; King, Noel; Kennedy, Damien; Imwold, Denise; Leonard, Warren Hsu; von Rohr, Heather (2005). Cut!: Hollywood Murders, Accidents, and Other Tragedies. Barrons Educational Series. 
 Donnelley, Paul (2003). Fade to Black: A Book of Movie Obituaries (2 ed.) Omnibus Press. 
 Frasier, David K. (2002). Suicide in the Entertainment Industry: An Encyclopedia of 840 Twentieth Century Cases. McFarland. 
 Halliwell, Leslie; Walker, John (2003). Halliwell's Who's Who In the Movies (15. ed.) HarperCollins. p. 422. 
 Liebman, Roy (2003). Vitaphone Films: A Catalogue of the Features and Shorts. McFarland. 
 Shipman Springer, John; Hamilton, Jack D. (1974). They Had Faces Then: Super Stars, Stars, and Starlets of the 1930s. Citadel Press. 
 Soister, John T. (2004). Up From the Vault: Rare Thrillers of the 1920s and 1930s. McFarland. 
 Star, Jimmy (2001). Barefoot on Barbed Wire: An Autobiography of a Forty-Year Hollywood Balancing Act. Rowman & Littlefield.

External links

Peggy Shannon at Virtual History

1907 births
1941 deaths
20th-century American actresses
Actresses from Arkansas
Alcohol-related deaths in California
American film actresses
Burials at Hollywood Forever Cemetery
People from Pine Bluff, Arkansas
Ziegfeld girls